Fairytales of Slavery is the penultimate release by Miranda Sex Garden, issued on Mute Records in June 1994. Produced in part by Alexander Hacke of Einstürzende Neubauten, the album blends a great number of elements of different genres, including gothic rock, darkwave, industrial, classical and ambient.

Track listing
"Cut" – 4:58
"Fly" – 3:41
"Peep Show" – 3:49
"The Wooden Boat" – 6:20
"Havana Lied" – 2:12
"Cover My Face" – 3:58
"Transit" – 2:54
"Freezing" – 2:23
"Serial Angels" – 3:21
"Wheel" – 6:14
"Intermission" – 1:38
"The Monk Song" – 3:25
"A Fairytale About Slavery" – 8:49 (includes an untitled, instrumental hidden track)

References

Miranda Sex Garden albums
1994 albums
Mute Records albums